Events in the year 1721 in Norway.

Incumbents
Monarch: Frederick IV

Events
The Bergen Greenland Company was founded.
2 May - Hans Egede departed with three ships from Bergen to Greenland, starting the Danish-Norwegian colonization of Greenland.
1 August - The King orders a large sale of church property in Norway.
10 September - Great Northern War ends.

Deaths
15 February – Tørres Christensen, merchant, ship owner, land owner (born 1664).

See also

References